Tarock is German for Tarot and may refer to:

 German Tarok, progenitor of a family of American and Austro-German card games
 Bavarian Tarock, once popular Bavarian card game
 Tarock (card games), generic name for Austrian and German tarot card games